Tommaso del Mazza, also known as the Master of Santa Verdiana, (active 1377–1392) was an Italian painter.

Biography
He trained in Florence, initially in the studio of Andrea Orcagna, but later with his brother Jacopo di Cione. He painted in typical Gothic art style, with gilded backgrounds.

Among his known works are:
Annunciation at the Getty Museum in California, likely originating from the Piccolomini Chapel at the Church of San Francesco, Pienza.
Madonna and Child with Six Saints (1390) at the High Museum of Art in Atlanta, Georgia.
Series of Panels with Passion and Life & Coronation of Virgin Scenes (1365-1375) putatively from the Oratory of the Confraternity of Jesus and the Cross in Florence (Confraternita di Gesu e della Croce)
Coronation of the Virgin (1380-1390) at the Louvre Museum in Paris, France
The Virgin and Child with Saints and Donors (ca. 1400), National Gallery of Ireland, in Dublin, Ireland

References

Gothic painters
Trecento painters
Year of birth unknown
Year of death unknown
Painters from Florence
Painters from Tuscany
14th-century people of the Republic of Florence
14th-century Italian painters
Italian male painters